Sir James Fortescue Flannery, 1st Baronet (16 December 1851 – 5 October 1943) was an English engineer and naval architect, and Liberal Unionist (later Conservative Party) politician.

Flannery was born in Liverpool, the son of Capt. John Flannery of Seacombe. Educated at the Liverpool College of Science and Victoria University, he worked in Birkenhead and was subsequently engaged by Sir Edward J Reid KCS later Chief Constructor of H.M Navy. He was head of Flannery, Baggally & Johnson Marine Engineering, which eventually opened offices in London, Liverpool and Rotterdam. and a Director of London and South Western Bank.  Between 1900 and 1906 he was President of the Railway Clerks' Association. He was President of the Institute of Marine Engineers 1914, and later President of the Society of Consulting Engineers 1931.

He was appointed J.P for Surrey 1892,  for Kent in 1895,  knighted  in 1899,  and appointed JP for Essex in 1904.

He was elected at the 1895 general election as Member of Parliament for Shipley in West Yorkshire, holding the seat until the 1906 general election. He returned to Parliament at the January 1910 election as Conservative Party MP for Maldon in Essex.

In the latter constituency he fought the 1918 election as a Coalition Conservative candidate, winning with a majority of 1823, but passing the baton over to Edward Ruggles-Brise for the 1922 election.

Created a baronet in 1904, of Wethersfield Manor, Essex, he was also Lord of the Manor of Wethersfield. In 1882 he married Edith Mary Emma, daughter of Osborn Jenkyn of Ealing who predeceased him by eight years.
Flannery died in October 1943 aged 91 leaving an estate valued at over £400,000, £150,000 being paid in tax. His son Sir Harold (born 1883) was given a life interest in the estate and provision was made through a trust fund for daughters Kathleen Edith (Hartridge) and Enid Fortescue (Lindsay). The family sold the Wethersfield property in 1957.
The terms of Flannery's will display a remarkable concern about premature burial with clear instructions as to how his body should be treated prior to interment.

References

Sources
 Essex in the 20th Century, WT Pike & Co.: London (1909).

External links 
 
 

1851 births
1943 deaths
British naval architects
Engineers from Merseyside
English justices of the peace
Liberal Unionist Party MPs for English constituencies
Conservative Party (UK) MPs for English constituencies
Baronets in the Baronetage of the United Kingdom
Knights Bachelor
UK MPs 1895–1900
UK MPs 1900–1906
UK MPs 1910
UK MPs 1910–1918
UK MPs 1918–1922
Members of Parliament for Maldon
Presidents of the Transport Salaried Staffs' Association